Márcio Mandinga dos Santos (born 23 January 1975), usually known as Márcio Mixirica, is a Brazilian football striker currently playing for Ponte Preta.

Honours 
Turkish Super League: 2000
UEFA Cup: 2000
Turkish Cup: 2000

External links

1975 births
Living people
People from Mogi das Cruzes
Brazilian footballers
Association football forwards
Clube Atlético Bragantino players
Paulista Futebol Clube players
Esporte Clube Juventude players
Associação Portuguesa de Desportos players
São José Esporte Clube players
Galatasaray S.K. footballers
Boavista F.C. players
Clube Atlético Mineiro players
Associação Desportiva São Caetano players
Santa Cruz Futebol Clube players
Esporte Clube Santo André players
Associação Atlética Ponte Preta players
Süper Lig players
Primeira Liga players
Brazilian expatriate footballers
Brazilian expatriate sportspeople in Portugal
Expatriate footballers in Turkey
Expatriate footballers in Portugal
UEFA Cup winning players
Footballers from São Paulo (state)